Monroe County Jail may refer to:

Monroe County Jail (Clarendon, Arkansas), listed on the National Register of Historic Places in Monroe County, Arkansas
Monroe County Jail (Athens, Mississippi), listed on the National Register of Historic Places in Monroe County, Mississippi